This is a list of television programs carried by FXX.

Current programming

Original programming

Comedy
It's Always Sunny in Philadelphia (2013; moved from FX)
Dave (2020)

Animation
Archer (2017; moved from FX, syndicated from 2015 to 2017)
Cake (2019)
Dicktown (2020)
Little Demon (2022)

Acquired programming
The Simpsons (2014) 
Family Guy (2019) 
Bob's Burgers (2019) 
King of the Hill (2021) 
The Cleveland Show (2021)
Futurama (2021)

Former programming

Original programming

Animation

Live-action

Acquired programming
Arrested Development (2013–17)
Freaks and Geeks (2013–17)
How I Met Your Mother (2013–14; moved to FX) 
The Hughleys (2013–17)
Mad About You (2013–17)
Parks and Recreation (2013–19)
Rescue Me (2013)
Spin City (2013–17)
Sports Night (2013–17)
Ali G Rezurection (2014)
In Living Color (2014–18)
Raising Hope (2014–18)
Anger Management (2016–18)
Mom (2017–21; moved to FX)
The Mick (2017–18)
Ghosted (2017)
LA to Vegas (2018)
Black-ish (2018–21; moved to Freeform)
The Weekly (2019–20)
Solar Opposites (2022)

Footnotes

References

FXX original programming
FXX